James Andrew Estill,  (born April 8, 1957) is a Canadian technology entrepreneur, executive, and philanthropist who has been serving as President and CEO of home appliance manufacturer Danby Products Ltd since 2015. During the course of his career, Estill has invested in 150 start-up companies and received international attention in 2015 for offering to sponsor the resettling of 50 Syrian refugee families in Canada. In recognition of his philanthropic efforts, Estill received the Order of Ontario in June 2017  and was named to the Order of Canada in July 2018. He also received an Everyday Heroes Award from the Global Hope Coalition in 2017.

Education
Estill studied engineering at the University of Waterloo, graduating in 1980 with a Bachelor of Science degree in Systems Design Engineering. He received an Honorary Doctorate of Laws from the University of Guelph in 2018.

Business career

1980-1999
In his final year of university, he started his first company, EMJ Data Systems. Operating with very modest means, Estill sold computer equipment and software, soon transitioning into distribution. The business grew quickly, became publicly traded on the Toronto Stock Exchange, and withstood that era's downturn in the IT industry.

His accomplishments at such a young age were recognized in 1996 when Estill was added to the ranks of Canada's Top 40 under 40, the second person to receive this honor. That same year, Estill joined the Young Presidents' Organization (YPO) and remains a member of the CNBC-YPO Chief Executive Network.

Estill served as a founding board member of Research in Motion/BlackBerry in 1997, before the company went public. He subsequently stayed with that organization until 2010. 1997 also found him acting as one of the founding members of Communitech., an organization devoted to helping tech companies grow and find their place in the market.

2000-2009
In 2003, EMJ purchased the Canadian operations of DaisyTek Canada, doubling their distribution size to more than $350 million in consolidated revenue. At its height, EMJ had 350 employees and $350 million in annual sales.

In June 2004, Synnex Canada purchased EMJ Data Systems for $56 million. As part of the deal, Estill took over as CEO of Synnex's Canadian division. During the five years that he ran Synnex from 2004–2009, sales for the company grew from $800 million to $2 billion.

Estill entered the world of blogging in the spring of 2005 with CEO Blog—Time Leadership, which documents his philosophies on leadership and time management, and which he continues to update with new posts on a regular basis.

In 2008, Estill was granted patent number 8244567 for gamification in ERP systems.

2010-present
In 2010, Estill published his first book, Time Leadership - Lessons from a CEO and followed that publication three years later with Zero to $2 Billion: The Marketing and Branding Story Behind the Growth. Estill also serves on the advisory board of OMERS Ventures, one of Canada's largest pension funds, which began operations in 2011.

Estill spoke about his success in the business world for a TEDx Talk called "Zero to $2 Billion" in New York City in April 2013.

In late 2014, Estill founded DDE Media, a Guelph, Ontario-based digital multimedia company. DDE merged two years later with TrafficSoda, a digital marketing firm, founded in 2013 by Jessica Chalk. Estill serves as chairman of the combined organization, with Chalk as President and CEO.

While continuing on in this capacity, Estill came out of semi-retirement to assume the post of CEO at Guelph, Ontario-based Danby Products in 2015,. In 2017, Estill purchased Danby Products and its subsidiaries from John Wood and his family. Under his guidance, the company resumed manufacturing some of its products in Canada for the first time in a number of years.

Seed Investor
In addition to the businesses he started on his own, Estill also served as a seed investor for over 150 companies, including well.ca, Printeron, Miovision, Clearpath Robotics, Postrank, Touch Bistro, Spicer, Inex, and Border Networks.

Philanthropy
In 2015, Estill grew distressed by the humanitarian crisis in Syria. Frustrated by the Canadian government's slow response, Estill decided in November 2015 to sponsor the immigration of 50 Syrian families to Guelph, Ontario. This worked out to a personal cost of about $1.5 million Canadian. He rallied church groups and 800 volunteers across the city and worked closely with the Islamic community.  Estill has now sponsored 87 families for resettlement. 

When asked why he decided to pursue this, Estill replied "Imagine going to work and discovering that your office isn't there anymore…Imagine going home from work and your home isn't there and you've heard that a cousin has been killed. People were living in fear and helping them come to Canada, a place of safety, was the right thing to do."

To achieve his ambitious goal, Estill decided to use the organizational skills he had developed over his long business career. After meeting with local clergy and related organizations, he budgeted that each Syrian family would need between $25,000-30,000 Canadian for life essentials over a one-year period.

For assistance, Estill called upon the Lakeside Church, the Salvation Army, Guelph's Roman Catholic community, the Muslim Society of Guelph and Welcome In Drop-in Centre, as well as friends and business associates. Arrangements were put in place to provide apartments, clothing, and English language instruction. Using his business network connections, Estill also helped arrange employment and career counselling. More than 800 local volunteers were registered and donated their time to the project.

Although it was hoped that the Syrian families would begin arriving by the end of 2015, this stalled by February 2016 when the Canadian government met its announced quota of bringing 25,000 Syrian refugees into the country. This led to problems storing donated items as the spaces would soon become unavailable. By the end of June, only 13 of the 50 planned families had settled in Guelph.

However, things soon improved and 47 families had relocated by the end of 2016. By that point, the total number of families Estill committed to help had also grown to 58 and totaled more than 200 people.

In addition to his own project, Estill also contributed his finances to help a nine-year-old local boy realize his family's dream of sponsoring a Syrian family in Canada.

In recognition of his philanthropic efforts, Estill received the Order of Ontario in June 2017. and was named to the Order of Canada in June 2018.

Awards and recognition
Canada's Top 40 Under 40, 1996
Alumni Achievement Medal for Professional Achievement, University of Waterloo, 2000
Hero of the Global Campaign Against Extremism & Intolerance, 2017
Order of Ontario, 2017
Order of Canada, 2018
Inducted into the Canadian Academy of Engineering (CAE), 2018
Ernst & Young Entrepreneur of the Year 2019 Ontario, 2019

References

External links
 

Living people
20th-century Canadian businesspeople
21st-century Canadian businesspeople
Canadian business executives
Canadian company founders
Canadian computer businesspeople
Canadian philanthropists
Canadian technology chief executives
Members of the Order of Canada
Members of the Order of Ontario
University of Waterloo alumni
1957 births